James "Jem" Mace (8 April 1831 – 30 November 1910) was an English boxing champion, primarily during the bare-knuckle era.  He was born at Beeston, Norfolk.  Although nicknamed "The Gypsy", he denied Romani ethnicity in his autobiography.  Fighting in England, at the height of his career between 1860 and 1866, he won the English Welterweight, Heavyweight, and Middleweight Championships and was considered one of the most scientific boxers of the era.  Most impressively, he held the World Heavyweight Championship from 1870 to 1871 while fighting in the United States.

Boxing career 
Mace was born the fifth of eight children to blacksmith William and his wife Ann Rudd Mace on 8 April 1831, in the remote village of Beeston, in rural Norfolk, England.

In the early 1850s, during his days as an exhibition boxer at Nat Langham's Rum Pum-pas boxing club at Cambrian Stores near what is now London's Charing Cross Road, Mace once boxed Archibald William Douglas (1818-1856), the 8th Marquess of Queensberry, known as Viscount Drumlanrig.  Douglas had served as a former member of the House of Commons and was the father of John Douglas, credited with helping to establish boxing's modern Marquess of Queensberry Rules.  During the same period and earlier, Mace completed what might be considered an apprenticeship in the boxing booth of former English middleweight champion Nat Langham, where he fought many talented amateurs, and a few men with the skills of professionals, touring and often performing at county fairs.  He would continue to supplement his income by performing exhibitions and giving sparring and training sessions for Langham's boxing club in London's Westminster through the early 1860s.  During his early work at county fairs, he was even known to play his violin to perform for the audience when he wasn't boxing amateurs and volunteers.

In one of his early bouts, at the age of 24, Mace defeated Bob Slack decisively on 2 October 1855 in Mildenhall, northeast of Cambridge, winning in nine rounds and only fourteen minutes.  On 17 February 1857, Mace defeated Bill Thorpe, an opponent close to his own height and weight, near Canvey Island, North of Kent, off the Thames Estuary in Essex, although the original location was the North Kentish marshes.  Mace dominated the fighting and in the eighteenth round delivered a stinging left and right to Thorpe's nose, with the right causing a knockdown.  Thorpe could not rise or continue the fight and his handler threw up the sponge ending the fight after twenty-three minutes.  The match was fought for £50 a side, and saw a good crowd considering both men were novices.  Pugilistica took note of Mace's speed, and the precision and strength with which he delivered his punches.

On 21 September 1858, Mace met Bob Brettle on the banks of the River Medway at Thames Haven, on the Essex Coast, for £100 a side, using London Prize Ring Rules, with Mace conceding the bout in only 2 rounds lasting three minutes.  A number of boxing historians now consider the bout to have been for the Welterweight Championship of England. In a second attempt at Brettle, Mace took the Welterweight title in five rounds near Foolness Island, by Yanklett Creek in Essex.

On 25 January 1859, Mace met the undefeated Posh Price for £50 a side at Aldershot Common, Hampshire.  In the 11th and last round, Mace hit Price with a strong blow on the left arm causing swelling, and likely a break.  Price's seconds threw up the sponge after the injury became apparent in only 17 minutes of fighting.  In a rough and damaging match, Mace displayed his characteristic scientific style of boxing.  Mace was aged less than 27 in this early match, but his blows were hard and precise, and he showed his customary speed, which would serve him well in his later career.

Mace met the boxer Bob Travers on 21 February 1860.  Travers, like Mace, was a friend of Nat Langham, and had boxed, and entertained, at his club at Westminster's Cambrian Stores. Mace would later compete against Travers in foot races.  Their boxing match was for £50 a side, and they first fought six rounds off the Thames at the North Kent Marshes and then, after the police intervened, they moved to a second location which was closer to, but still to the southeast of London.    By the 33rd and 34th rounds, it was evident that, though Travers tried to lead, Mace had the better defence, and continued to get in more and harder punches.  Having had the better of the match, Mace finally won on a foul that occurred in the 57th round, when Travers appeared to intentionally throw himself on the ground to avoid his blow after one hour, thirty-one minutes of fighting.

English heavyweight champion, 1861

On 18 June 1861, he first won the title of Heavyweight Champion of England by defeating reigning champion Sam Hurst in 8 rounds, and 40 minutes at Medway Island, Kent.  Langham had carefully schooled Mace in the finer points of boxing. Though Hurst was as much as 50 pounds heavier, and at least three inches taller, he may have been better schooled and experienced in wrestling, and had broken his leg the year before, likely affecting his speed and form.  He was considered by many to be an awkward boxer and to lack speed due largely to his weight and size.  After taking a commanding lead, in the eighth, Mace stepped back after lightly hitting Hurst, who had lost nearly all ability to defend himself.  Hurst unwisely made another charge, and Mace was forced to land another blow, after which Hurst's seconds threw up the sponge, ending the match after 50 minutes.  Mace showed skill both in his defence and attack.  Hurst, who fought relatively few professional bouts, retired from the ring not long after his loss.

Heavyweight title defences

His victory over Hurst led to his first defence of the English heavyweight title against Tom King on a cold and rainy 28 January 1862 for £200 a side, before a crowd of around 400.  This first title defence, staged in Godstone, England, was fought bare knuckle under London Prize Ring Rules and lasted for 43 rounds and 68 minutes. Mace had studied King and taken careful notes on his style, but King outweighed him by as much as twenty pounds and had a height advantage as well.  For the first 30 rounds King fought evenly with Mace, the reigning champion, but in the second half of the fight Mace took control, and despite being nearly blinded in both eyes by King's blows in the early fighting, finished King with a crushing blow to the throat in the final round.  In the 30th, Mace tripped King with the back of his heel, pushing him forward, and King fell hard, awkwardly landing on his head.  In the 40th, Mace downed King with two uppercuts to the jaw, and fell upon him.  In the 43rd and final round, Mace landed another uppercut to the jaw or throat prior to several close in blows, and then threw King who collapsed and was unable to rise.  Mace's most prominent injuries were to the left side of his face and eye.

Mace and King met at Medway, 28 miles from London for a rematch less than a year later on 26 November 1862 for £200 a side.  King was four years younger than Mace, roughly four inches taller, and approximately twenty pounds heavier.  Mace seemed to dominate the infighting, though the pace of King's blows may have been faster, and he appeared to have won the thirteenth.  In the opinion of several ringside reporters, Mace had a moderate lead up until the 20th round, when he landed a left to King's face. At this point, Mace still led the betting at 4–1.

About to administer a similar blow, Mace's foot slipped slightly and King administered a strong right under his eye on the left side of his nose, sending him to the ground and nearly causing a knockout.  In the 21st, King administered the same blow to Mace with his right, again knocking Mace to the grass, and causing the vanquished boxer's seconds to concede the match after 28 minutes of fighting.  King took the heavyweight crown, and  Mace and his seconds fully conceded the loss.

On 24 February 1863, Mace was presented the Windham Gold Cup, a boxing trophy, by Sir William Frederick Windham at Criterion Hall, the precursor to the modern Criterion Theatre, in recognition of his winning the heavyweight boxing championship of England.  The trophy, said to contain 100 ounces of gold, was presented at Westminster's Leicester Square not far from Nat Langham's Cambrian Stores tavern and was considered to be worth £80,000 in modern currency.

English middleweight champion

Mace was first recognised as English Middleweight champion on 1 September 1863, following his 19-round victory over Joe Goss, first staged at Wooton.  The two boxers fought at catchweights of 10 stones, 10 pounds, or roughly 68 kg (150 lbs.), currently in the very light middleweight range.  Very little fighting occurred at Wooton, and when the police intervened after thirteen minutes, the fight was moved first to Bassett, then finally to Purfleet, Essex, near London.  The purse was an exceptional £1000 to be split between the two boxers and the fighting ended at Purfleet after eighteen rounds taking two hours and ten minutes. In the final round, Mace landed a right handed lunge to the left of Goss's jaw that knocked him out. Puglistica wrote that "Goss was entirely overmatched in science, length, and weight".

Regaining heavyweight championship

He regained the English heavyweight championship against Goss in a 21-round victory on 6 August 1866 between Purfleet, Essex, and Gravesend on the North bank of the Thames, twenty miles East of London. By one reliable account, the ring used was only sixteen feet square, eight square feet shorter than the regulation size. Mace was said to be suffering from a strained left foot or ankle.  In a close physical matching, Goss was nearly the same height, and only a few pounds lighter, at around 158 pounds.  Goss, though he had the vitality of a man nearly seven years younger, did not gain from the advantage, as Mace's experience, skill, and conditioning seemed to count for more than the wear he'd received from his years in the ring.  Mace deftly avoided Goss's strong rushes with a shift of his shoulders or a bob of his head, showing great flexibility and speed.  Mace could strike or counter quickly, particularly using his left, and often did so under Goss's defences, even in the early rounds where he scored early and with precision.  Mace, in the 14th through 20th rounds, got the better of Goss, frequently striking his left eye with his right fist.  At the end of the match in the 21st round, Mace remained strong, but Goss was groggy and weak.  Mace was said to have very few injuries, but Goss had been battered around the "head, face, neck, and chest", with loosened teeth and badly battered eyes.  In the final round, Goss's seconds threw up the sponge ending the fight when their boxer staggered in his attempt to land a blow on Mace, who defended himself by merely stepping aside.

Bare-knuckle boxing was an outlawed sport and both boxers, trainers, and seconds were often liable for arrest and prosecution. In 1867, Mace was arrested on the night before his scheduled title defence against Ned O'Baldwin in Woodford Essex, by the Metropolitan Police.  He was held over in court not to fight again, and the incident influenced him to seek his fortune in America.

In 1869 he relocated to the United States where prizefighting was still flourishing. He toured with the celebrated American boxer John C. Heenan, giving exhibitions of glove boxing.

World heavyweight champion, 1870
In what should be considered his most significant victory, on 10 May 1870, he defeated the English-born American boxer Tom Allen for a purse of $2500 a side or roughly the impressive sum of £3080, in a ten-round bout lasting around 45 minutes in Kennerville, Louisiana.  The fight was for what is now considered by boxing historians to have been the heavyweight world championship, though it was often considered an American championship as well.  Allen was ten years younger than Mace's advanced age of 39.  Allen threw Mace in the sixth, but when he threw Mace again in the last round, he broke or dislocated his shoulder when he landed awkwardly on the ground.  Allen had injuries to his eyes and mouth largely from lightning-fast left jabs, while Mace's face looked nearly untouched.

On 6 April 1871, Mace suffered a loss in New Orleans to Gentleman Jose Alonso.

He defended the heavyweight title in one of his last significant fights against Joe Coburn on 30 November 1871 in a ten-round draw at Bay St. Louis, Mississippi, forty miles from New Orleans.  Both men were close in weight and height.  The first scheduled title fight between the two, in 1864, did not go ahead as Mace failed to show.  Coburn was furious that Mace had prevented him from participating in the lucrative match, which would have drawn a large crowd. In the November 1871 fight, Mace was thrown repeatedly, and took some hard falls.  Coburn injured his right wrist in the fifth as he threw Mace hard over the ropes. In the eighth round, known as "chancery", Coburn held Mace around the head and punched him several times. In the tenth and eleventh, Mace's left hand becomes more swollen, and difficult to use.  At the request of the referee, the fighters agreed to call it a draw in the 12th round, as neither was inclined to strongly engage the other, largely due to their injured hands.  The torrential rain may have partly been the cause of the abbreviated match as it required the boxers to fight up to their knees in mud.

Following an attempt on his life in Mississippi, he returned to England. On the evening of 16 December 1876, he was back in America, this time as a glove boxer, and in an historic early clash for a purse of $100 under Queensberry Rules, he defeated Bill Davis at National Guard Hall at Virginia City, Nevada.  In the last and ninth round, Mace found Davis's eye and scored, and when the fight was called at the end of the round with both men clinching, the total score was 52 for Mace and 32 for Davis.  It was a convincing win for Mace who landed more blows, but Davis showed well against a top-rated opponent.

At the age of fifty-eight, on 7 February 1890, he fought a match with the much younger boxer Charlie Mitchell of Birmingham in Glasgow, Scotland for the vacant English heavyweight title, but lost in four rounds.

Exhibitions
As Mace rose to become the British champion he supplemented his income with exhibition work in the popular Victorian travelling circuses, becoming a circus proprietor himself for a short time.  Most notably, he toured Lancashire with Pablo Fanque's Circus Royal in the late summer and autumn of 1861—Fanque being England's first black circus proprietor.  Fanque was later honoured in the Beatles song "Being for the Benefit of Mr. Kite!"

In the summer of 1870, he gave three-round exhibitions in New Jersey and New York with American champion Joe Coburn.

In 1878–79, Mace had as many as 30 three-round exhibition exhibitions with John Thompson in Melbourne, Victoria, Australia, and two with the Australian champion he had mentored, Larry Foley.  These exhibitions, fought with gloves, paved the way for the worldwide acceptance of gloved boxing, and eventually the newer Queensberry Rules which required new gloves for each boxer.  In 1882 he toured New Zealand where he discovered future world heavyweight champion Bob Fitzsimmons. With the help of his protégé, Australian champion Larry Foley, he schooled a generation of mostly Australian boxers, including the Caribbean-born Peter Jackson, multiple-weight-class champion, British-born Bob Fitzsimmons, and Young Griffo.  In 1883, he returned to America as manager of the New Zealander Herbert Slade.  He toured extensively with Slade in exhibitions in the latter half of 1882 in New Zealand and in the first half of 1883, first in New York, and then back in England. Around 1885, he performed a benefit with his close friend and boxing partner Bill Clark in New York.

On 10 February 1883, Mace returned to England after the death of his son Edward Albert from drowning in the Thames, and resumed his English exhibitions by April of that year with Herbert Slade.  In 1884, he performed English exhibitions with Ed Smith and Jack Smith and toured England with exhibitions against Jack Knifton and Charlie Mitchell from 1886 to 1887.  He continued to fight the occasional exhibition in England through 1895.

In December 1896, returning to New York City to fight Mike Donovan in a brief exhibition, he was acclaimed by world heavyweight champion James J. Corbett as "the man to whom we owe the changes that have elevated the sport".  Mace continued his career exclusively as an exhibition boxer and his last recorded entry into the ring was in 1909 when he was 78 years of age.  On 8 March 1897, he performed a four-round exhibition with former world welterweight champion Tommy Ryan in Syracuse, New York, before returning to England that Summer.

He continued to fight exhibitions in 1897, and in 1898 opened a boxing academy in Cape Town, South Africa.  He performed exhibitions with Jack Valentine in Cape Town in 1903 and 1904.

Other pursuits and death
Mace was a skillful violinist who originally aspired to a career in music and continued with the art through his career as a boxer.  Some believe the destruction of his violin in his early life by three thugs in Great Yarmouth, Norfolk, and his subsequent anger and retaliation led him to a life in the ring. In 1856, he was credited with playing  "The Cuckoo Song", and "Black Jack Davey" on his violin at the Strand, a supper club in London, while afterwards posing shirtless.  In 1862 Mace began his own circus, appearing throughout England including Canterbury, Brighton, Ipswich, and Norwich through December of the year.  Earlier in 1862, he had learned the trade and been well paid sparring in safe exhibitions with Tom King at Ginett's Circus, in Oxford, Portsmouth, and Exeter.

In 1870, Mace had a small role in the Shakespearean production of "As You Like It", on Broadway's Niblo Theatre in New York City and played several shows to crowded houses.  Though he acted as a wrestler and spoke only a few lines of the script, the rougher patrons from New York's "Bowery" enjoyed his realistic portrayal of a wrestler and knew him as a famous heavyweight boxer.

Hotels and saloons owned 
In 1866, Mace became the proprietor of the Strawberry Gardens pleasure grounds at West Derby, Lancashire, near Liverpool a beautifully landscaped park which featured the sports of running, bowling, jumping, wrestling and boxing.  Mace himself would often be featured in the boxing displays.   At various times, he was also a professional runner, bar owner and keeper, circus proprietor and racehorse owner.  The Swan Inn on Norwich's Swan Lane was one of the first Inns from which he displayed his sign in the mid 1850s.  He kept the Capitol Saloon in New York City for several years, on Twenty-Third Street in Manhattan.  With his partner, Mace profited from his percentage of the gambling upstairs which included Faro, Routlette, Boston props, an old card game, Rouge et Noir, using red and black diamond cards, and other card games.  The Saloon was frequented by notorious underworld criminals including shanghaier Shang Draper. John Morrissey, the former boxer, Dead Rabbits criminal gang leader, and Tammany Hall politician had a bloodless dispute in Mace's saloon. In 1871, Jimmy Haggerty, a gangster from Philadelphia, was mortally wounded in a bar fight in Mace's Saloon from a gunshot delivered by Reddy the Blacksmith, of the Bowery Boys gang.  Mace later ran a hotel in Australia's Melbourne suburb of Flemington with boxer George Thompson as a partner. By 1881, while running his hotel, he owned racehorses, a few of which he ran in Australia's Melbourne Cup. In 1902, at the Coronation Tournament at London's Royal Albert Hall, Mace sponsored or participated in a show honouring the coronation of King Edward VII that combined boxing with wrestling, fencing, running, cycling and gymnastics, as part of England's National Sporting Club.
 
In his late sixties, after he returned to England, he ran the Black Lion Hotel on Cohill Street in Birmingham.  Mace married three times, twice bigamously, and fathered at least fourteen children by five women. He is believed by a few sources to have had an affair with famous American Louisiana-born actress Adah Isaacs Menken, who performed frequently in England.

During his life Mace made and gambled away a considerable fortune.  After the death of his wife, according to one source, he began to lose his fortune rapidly, and in his last years lived on the English old-age pension of 5 shillings a week and the generosity of friends.  He ended his life as a penniless street musician in Jarrow, Durham, with his death assigned to natural causes, and was buried in an unmarked grave at Anfield Cemetery, Liverpool, England. Funeral services were conducted by his son Alfred, a priest.  Several sources reported that his total net worth acquired during his prime may have reached $1,000,000 in American 1910 currency or roughly £800,000 in the British currency of 1870, or £20,000,000 in today's currency.  In 2002, the Merseyside Former Boxers' Association arranged an attractive black marble engraved memorial headstone for his grave.

Honours 
Mace has a commemorative plaque in the centre of Norwich.

Ring Magazine established a Hall of Fame in 1954, and most of their members subsequently became members of the  International Boxing Hall of Fame.  Mace was the 34th  inductee to the organization in 1990.

He was a 2014 inductee for the Australian National Boxing Hall of Fame in the International category.

In popular culture
"Lando", a western by Louis L'Amour calls him "the world champion prize fighter, an Englishman and a gypsy. He whipped the best of them, and he was not a large man, but he was among the first to apply science to the art of fist fighting." "By footwork you can shift a man out of position... Certain blows automatically create openings for the blows to follow." "Never weighing more than 160 pounds, he had been the world's champion, defeating men as much as 60 pounds heavier."

Professional boxing record

See also
 List of bare-knuckle boxers

References

External links
  'Master of the Ring' by Graham Gordon
  New Book on Jem Mace. Preview
  Jem Mace, Champion of the World
  Biography of Jem Mace
  Jem Mace the Gypsy
  Swansong for Jem of a boxer
  Jem Mace, 'The Last Bare Knuckle Heavy Weight Champion of the World' by Jason Mace
 Mace appearing in Sydney 1877 performing his tableaux

1831 births
1910 deaths
19th-century English people
20th-century English people
English Romani people
Bare-knuckle boxers
English male boxers
Romani sportspeople
People from Breckland District
Burials at Anfield Cemetery